Mary Rosalind Soriano Revillame (born December 9, 1982), known professionally as Meryll Soriano, is a multi-awarded Filipino actress.

Career
Meryll Soriano started acting as a child star during the early 90s appearing in "The Maricel Soriano Drama Special" top-billed by aunt Diamond Star Maricel Soriano with Executive Producer and mom, Maria Victoria Soriano. Soriano acted in movies such as Nasaan Ka Nang Kailangan Kita (1996) with Judy Ann Santos and Wowie de Guzman, and Computer Kombat (1997) with Aiza Seguerra. She also appeared in GMA's TV series Sana ay Ikaw na Nga (2001–2003) with Tanya Garcia and Dingdong Dantes, ABS-CBN's fantasy series Marina (2004) with Claudine Barretto, and Super Inggo (2006–2007) with Makisig Morales.

In 2014, she appeared on Honesto in a guest role, and later became part of the cast of Ikaw Lamang with Coco Martin, Julia Montes, Kim Chiu and Jake Cuenca.

In 2015, she returned to GMA Network after 10 years of stay with ABS-CBN to play a major antagonist role in My Mother's Secret. She made a guest appearance in Little Nanay and a supporting role in That's My Amboy. She then appeared in Dear Uge and Wagas.

In 2017, she came back on ABS-CBN and joined the horror-fantasy drama series La Luna Sangre, as Greta Lumakad. She later joined the main cast of the 2019 TV series Starla.

Personal life
She is the daughter of actor and TV host Willie Revillame and Bec-Bec Soriano. She is the niece of actress and The Diamond Star Maricel Soriano.

She was married to actor Bernard Palanca on September 8, 2006. They broke up five months later when she was pregnant. They have a son, Elijah.
On January 1, 2021, Soriano introduced their 2nd baby with Joem Bascon but no details on when she gave birth.

She has bipolar disorder.

Filmography

Television

Films
Angkas (2022)
Culion (2019)
John Denver Trending (2019)
Honor Thy Father (2015)
Donor (2010)
Pinoy Sunday (2009)
Irene and Jordan (2009)
Kamoteng Kahoy (2009)
Concerto (2008)
Voices (2008)
Ploning (2008)
Super Inggo 1.5: Ang Bagong Bangis Super Inday (2007)
Numbalikdiwa (2006)
Rekados (2006)
Rotonda (2006)
In da Red Corner (2006)
Goodbye My Shooting Star (2006)
Bagong Agos (2005)
Room Boy (2005)
Labs Kita, Okey Ka Lang (1998)
Kahit Minsan Lang (1997)
Computer Kombat (1997)
Nasaan Ka ng Kailangan Kita (1996)
Elena's Redemption (1996)
Da Best In The West 2: Da Western Pulis Stori (1996)
Kung Kaya Mo, Kaya Ko Rin (1996)
Guwapings Dos (1993)
Si Lucio at si Miguel: Hihintayin Kayo sa Langit (1992)
Buddy en Sol (Sine Ito) (1992)
Rocky Plus V (1991)
John en Marsha '86: TNT sa Amerika (1986) credited as Meryll Revillame

Awards and nominations

References

External links

1982 births
Living people
Filipino film actresses
Filipino television actresses
Filipino women comedians
ABS-CBN personalities
Star Magic
GMA Network personalities
People with bipolar disorder